John Thomas Watson (January 16, 1908 – April 29, 1965) was a  Major League Baseball player. He batted left and threw right-handed.

In 1986, he was inducted into the Marshall University Athletics Hall of Fame for his collegiate career in baseball and basketball.

He was born in Tazewell, Virginia, and died in Huntington, West Virginia.

References

External links

1908 births
1965 deaths
Baseball players from Virginia
Clarksburg Generals players
Detroit Tigers players
Hartford Senators players
Huntington Boosters players
Major League Baseball shortstops
Marshall Thundering Herd baseball coaches
Marshall Thundering Herd baseball players
Marshall Thundering Herd men's basketball players
Reading Red Sox players
Wheeling Stogies players

People from Tazewell, Virginia
Rehoboth Beach Sea Hawks players
Minor league baseball managers